The Roman Catholic Diocese of Teixeira de Freitas–Caravelas is a diocese located in the cities of Teixeira de Freitas and Caravelas in the Ecclesiastical province of São Salvador da Bahia in Brazil.

History
 21 July 1962: Established as Diocese of Caravelas from the Diocese of Ilhéus
 18 April 1983: Renamed as Diocese of Teixeira de Freitas–Caravelas

Leadership, in reverse chronological order
 Bishops of Teixeira de Freitas-Caravelas (Roman rite), below
 Bishop Jailton de Oliveira Lino, P.S.D.P. (2017.11.15 - present)
 Bishop Carlos Alberto dos Santos (2005.06.15 – 2017.02.01), appointed Bishop of Itabuna, Bahia
 Bishop Antônio Eliseu Zuqueto, O.F.M. Cap. (1983.04.18 – 2005.06.15)
 Bishop of Caravelas (Roman Rite), below
 Bishop Filippo Tiago Broers, O.F.M. (1963.05.02 – 1983.04.18)

References
 GCatholic.org
 Catholic Hierarchy

Roman Catholic dioceses in Brazil
Christian organizations established in 1962
Teixeira de Freitas-Caravelas, Roman Catholic Diocese of
Roman Catholic dioceses and prelatures established in the 20th century
1962 establishments in Brazil